Erik von Holst (30 August 1894, in Vaivara Parish, Estonia – 31 May 1962, in Eutin, West Germany) was an Estonian/German sailor and ice sailor who represented Estonia in the 1936 Summer Olympics in the men's olympic monotype class. He also designed and constructed the International Monotype-XV ice yacht.

References 
 Baltische Segler-Vereinigung e.V. E. von Holst (German)

External links 
 Erik von Holst - the designer of the XV Biography at Official homepage of International Monotype-XV Ice Yacht Racing Association
  Monotype-XV ice yacht

1894 births
1962 deaths
Estonian male sailors (sport)
Olympic sailors of Estonia
Sailors at the 1936 Summer Olympics – O-Jolle
Ice yachting
Estonian yacht designers
Estonian designers
Russian nobility
Baltic-German people
Estonian people of Baltic German descent
Estonian emigrants to Germany